Norrbotten Artillery Corps, designation A 5, was a Swedish Army artillery unit which operated between 1928 and 1951. The unit was based in Boden Garrison in Boden, Sweden.

History
On 1 April 1910, the Norrbotten Artillery Regiment's Detachment in Boden (A 4 B) was raised, and on 6 June 1910, the detachment was placed to Boden. The detachment consisted of III (Artillery) Division of Norrland Artillery Regiment (A 4). Through the Defence Act of 1925, it was decided to separate the division from Norrland Artillery Regiment (A 4), to form an independent unit. On 31 December 1927, the detachment was disbanded, and on 1 January 1928, the Norrbotten Artillery Corps (A 5) was raised as a horse field artillery corps.

After World War II, the idea was that the Swedish defense would be disarmed. Prior to the Defence Act of 1948, it appeared in the 1945 report of the Defence Committee, that it proposed, among other things, that Norrbotten Artillery Corps (A 5) would be amalgamated with Boden Artillery Regiment (A 8). Instead of a cooling down of the security policy situation in Europe after the war, a new security policy was initiated through the Cold War, which can be said to be initiated by the 1948 Czechoslovak coup d'état. This prompted the Minister of Defence to instead advocate a strengthening of the defence. In December 1947, the Defence Committee's proposal fell and instead it was decided on a reinforcement. However, the Riksdag adopted the Defence Committee's proposal, which in practice meant that Norrbotten Artillery Corps was amalgamated into Boden Artillery Regiment.

In 1951, the Swedish government proposed to the Riksdag a restriction of the Swedish Army's peace organization, which meant that Norrbotten Artillery Corps (A 5), the Scanian Cavalry Regiment (Skånska kavalleriregementet, K 5), the Göta Train Regiment in Norea (Göta trängregementes kompani i Nora, T 2 N) and the Öresund Naval District (Öresunds marindistrikt, MDÖ) would be disbanded. The government's proposal was adopted by the Riksdag, and thus the Norrbotten Artillery Corps would be disbanded as a separate peace unit during the financial year 1951/1952, so that during the same financial year, it would be amalgamated into Boden Artillery Regiment. On 28 April 1951, a disbandment ceremony for the corps was held, which was disbanded officially on 30 June 1951. However, the artillery division remained at the eastern barracks on Sveavägen until 1954, when it was also geographically transferred to Boden's Artillery Regiment at Åbergsleden.

Barracks and training areas

The Norrland Artillery Regiment's Detachment was placed in the barracks area along Sveavägen, which was originally planned for the Norrbotten Cavalry Corps (Norrbottens kavallerikår, K 9). During the years 1928–1940, the barracks area was shared with the 3rd Squadron of Norrland Dragoon Regiment (K 4), which were located in the western barracks. On 19 July 1940, the barracks were taken over by Boden Signal Company (S 1 B), which were located there until 31 October 1945. After the disbandment of the corps, and when the artillery division left the area, the barracks area was taken over entirely by the Signal Battalion in Boden (S 3). From 31 August 2005, the Artillery Regiment (A 9) is located in the barracks area.

Heraldry and traditions

Colours, standards and guidons
On 16 June 1, 1938, His Majesty the King Gustaf V presented a standard Norrbotten Artillery Corps. From 1 July 1951, the traditions and the standard of the corps were carried on and by the Boden Artillery Regiment (A 8). From 1 July 2000, the standard and traditions were passed on to the Norrland Artillery Battalion (Artbat/I 19). Since 1 January 2006, there is no unit specifically for the unit's standard or traditions.

Other
When the corps was raised on 1 January 1928, it took over the designation from the disbanded Uppland Artillery Regiment (A 5). The corps also took over the regimental march, "Artillery V", also known as "Artillerimarsch" (G. Ström) and the color of the regiment, dark red. When the corps was disbanded and amalgamated into Boden Artillery Regiment (A 8), the Bergslagen Artillery Regiment (A 9) took over march of Norrbotten Artillery Corps. It was adopted on 1 July 2000 by the Artillery Regiment (A 9).

Commanding officers
Commanding officers from 1928 to 1951.

1928–1931: Per Falk
1931–1937: Samuel Åkerhielm
1937–1940: August O. L. Rehnberg
1940–1942: Sven Salander
1942–1943: Fernando Odenrick
1943–1946: Stig Tarras-Wahlberg
1946–1951: Gösta Jörlin

Names, designations and locations

See also
List of Swedish artillery regiments

Footnotes

References

Notes

Print

Further reading

Artillery corps of the Swedish Army
Military units and formations established in 1928
Military units and formations disestablished in 1951
Disbanded units and formations of Sweden
1928 establishments in Sweden
1951 disestablishments in Sweden
Boden Garrison